Hiking in the Pyrénées-Orientales is very popular because of its wide range of hiking tracks and scenery in the Pyrenees mountain range by the Mediterranean Sea.
They are Pyrénées-Orientales' premier venue, through areas of some of the best scenery in the country. The tracks are maintained to a high standard, making it easier for visitors to explore some of the most scenic parts of Pyrénées' backcountry.

List of great hikes 

 Canigou Range Tracks
 Capcir Highlands Tracks
 Carlit Lakes Journey
 Força Real Trail
 French Cerdagne Trail
 Puigmal Mountain Trail
 Vallespir Forest Track
 Vauban Heritage Tracks
 Vermilion Coast Tracks

Major Trans-pyrenees crossing trails 

 Crossing the Pyrenees though the more accessible GR 10 in France parallel to the GR 11 in Spain.
 The Haute Randonnée Pyrénéenne is a coast to coast route through the Pyrénées, that links the Atlantic to the Mediterranean. the HRP is on the ridge line, crossing alternately  French and Spanish slopes.

Gallery

See also
 Pyrénées-Orientales
 Trail blazing

External links
 Club Alpin Français in the Pyrénées-Orientales (in french)
 French Hiking Federation (in french)

Hiking trails in France
Pyrenees
Tourist attractions in Pyrénées-Orientales